The 2018–19 Robert Morris Colonials men's basketball team represented Robert Morris University during the 2018–19 NCAA Division I men's basketball season. The Colonials, led by ninth-year head coach Andrew Toole, played their home games at the North Athletic Complex in Pittsburgh, Pennsylvania as members of the Northeast Conference.  They finished the season 18–17, 11–7 in NEC play to finish in  fourth place. As the No. 4 seed in the NEC tournament, they defeated No. 5 seed St. Francis Brooklyn in the quarterfinals before losing in the semifinals to No. 2 seed Fairleigh Dickinson.  They were invited to the 2019 CollegeInsider.com Postseason Tournament where they defeated Cornell in the first round before falling to Presbyterian College in the second round.

Previous season
The Colonials finished the 2017–18 season, 16–17, 9–9 in NEC play to finish in a tie for sixth place. As the No. 7 seed in the NEC tournament, they upset No. 2 seed Mount St. Mary's in the quarterfinals, before losing in the semifinals to No. 1 seed Wagner.

Roster

Schedule and results

|-
!colspan=12 style=| Exhibition

|-
!colspan=12 style=| Non-conference regular season

|-
!colspan=12 style=| NEC regular season

|-
!colspan=12 style=| NEC tournament
|-

|-
!colspan=12 style=| CollegeInsider.com Postseason tournament
|-

|-

Source

References

Robert Morris Colonials men's basketball seasons
Robert Morris Colonials
Robert Morris Colonials men's basketball team
Robert Morris Colonials men's basketball team
Robert Morris